Nora Perry MBE ( Gardner, born 1954) is an English former badminton player noted for her anticipation, racket control, and tactical astuteness. A doubles specialist, Perry won numerous major titles, with a variety of partners, from the mid-1970s to the mid-1980s. These included six All-England mixed doubles and two All-England women's doubles championships. She won both the 1980 IBF World Championships and the 1980 European Championships in women's doubles with Jane Webster.  Three years later, she won the 1983 IBF World Championships title in mixed doubles with Thomas Kihlström. Generally regarded as one of the greatest female mixed doubles players in the game's history, in 1999 she was inducted into the World Badminton Hall of Fame.

Achievements 
Mixed doubles

World Cup 
Mixed doubles

International tournaments 
Mixed doubles

Notes

References
 All England Champions 1899-2007
 English results
 European results
 Pat Davis: The Encyclopaedia of Badminton. Robert Hale, London, 1987, p. 120-121,

External links
 
 
 
 

1954 births
Living people
English female badminton players
Members of the Order of the British Empire
Commonwealth Games medallists in badminton
Commonwealth Games gold medallists for England
Commonwealth Games silver medallists for England
Badminton players at the 1974 British Commonwealth Games
Badminton players at the 1978 Commonwealth Games
World Games medalists in badminton
World Games silver medalists
Competitors at the 1981 World Games
Medallists at the 1974 British Commonwealth Games
Medallists at the 1978 Commonwealth Games